Compulsive Disclosure is the second compilation album by the American punk rock band Pinhead Gunpowder. It was released on October 21, 2003, through Lookout! Records. The album features songs from the group's eponymously titled 2000 EP, the Dillinger Four / Pinhead Gunpowder split EP, the 8 Chords, 328 Words EP and also features re-recorded versions of the songs "2nd Street" and "At Your Funeral" (originally from Dillinger Four / Pinhead Gunpowder). Compulsive Disclosure was re-released on CD and vinyl through Recess Records on February 12, 2010, with two unreleased tracks, "Salting Agents" and "El Lasso Grappo".

Track listing

 Wilhelm Fink is another name for Billie Joe Armstrong as featured singing on the track "New Blood"

Personnel
 Aaron Cometbus – drums, vocals
 Billie Joe Armstrong – guitar, vocals
 Jason White – guitar, vocals
 Bill Schneider – bass, vocals

Additional performers
 Ed. Jeanne Geiger - trombone on "Black Mountain Pt.3"
 Joe Savage - trumpet on "Black Mountain Pt.3"

Production
 Willie Samuels - production
 Aaron Cometbus - graphic design, artwork
 Bill Schneider - photography

References

2003 albums
Pinhead Gunpowder albums
Lookout! Records albums